Wensing is a surname. Notable people with the surname include:

Luisa Wensing (born 1993), German footballer
Thomas Wensing (born 1978), German poet and short story writer